Woodtown is a hamlet on Dartmoor in Devon, England. It is roughly south of Sampford Spiney along the river Walkham.

Hamlets in Devon